This article is the discography of English rock and roll singer Marty Wilde, including releases with the Wildcats, as part of the Wilde Three (with Joyce Wilde and Justin Hayward) and under various pseudonyms.

Albums

Studio albums

Live albums

Soundtrack albums

Cast recording albums

Compilation albums

Video albums

EPs

Singles

Notes

References 

Discographies of British artists